Balarambati is a census town in Singur CD Block in Chandannagore subdivision of Hooghly district in the Indian state of West Bengal.

Geography

Location

The area is composed of flat alluvial plains that form a part of the Gangetic Delta.

Urbanisation
In Chandannagore subdivision 58.52% of the population is rural and the urban population is 41.48%. Chandannagore subdivision has 1 municipal corporation, 3 municipalities and 7 census towns. The single municipal corporation is Chandernagore Municipal Corporation. The municipalities are Tarakeswar Municipality, Bhadreswar Municipality and Champdany Municipality. Of the three CD Blocks in Chandannagore subdivision, Tarakeswar CD Block is wholly rural, Haripal CD Block is predominantly rural with just 1 census town, and Singur CD Block is slightly less rural with 6 census towns. Polba Dadpur and Dhaniakhali CD Blocks of Chinsurah subdivision (included in the map alongside) are wholly rural. The municipal areas are industrialised. All places marked in the map are linked in the larger full screen map.

Demographics
As per 2011 Census of India Balarambati had a total population of 5,068 of which 2,558 (50%) were males and 2,510 (50%) were females. Population below 6 years was 454. The total number of literates in Balarambati was 4,122 (89.34% of the population over 6 years).

Transport
Balarambati is on the State Highway 2 (also known as the Baidyabati-Tarakeswar Road). Balarambati railway station on Howrah-Bardhaman chord serves the locality.

Education
Madhubati Surabala Vidyamandir is a co-educational high school in Balaramabati. It was established in 1947. It has arrangements for teaching from Class VI to X.

References

Cities and towns in Hooghly district